What a Woman! is a 1943 American romantic comedy film directed by  Irving Cummings and starring Rosalind Russell and Brian Aherne.

The screenplay concerns a literary agent Carol Ainsley's trying to transform her star client, Michael Cobb, into the actor playing his most famous character. After it becomes obvious that it's impossible and he quits, Henry Pepper, a journalist writing a profile on the agent, calls him and convinces him that he's in love with Carol. Michael returns and the media embellishes their relationship constraining Carol to lead him on.

Plot
Henry Pepper (Brian Aherne), top writer for Knickerbocker magazine, is assigned to write a profile on Carol Ainsley (Rosalind Russell), who has been named the outstanding career woman of the year. Carol, a super agent and star-maker, has just scooped her competition by selling the movie rights to the romance novel Whirlwind and is spending a fortune to find the perfect actor to play the male lead. When Carol learns that the book's author, Anthony Street, may be the man to play his own hero, she searches him out and discovers that he is actually Professor Michael Cobb (Willard Parker) of Buxton College.

Although handsome and blonde, the professor is an intellectual snob immersed in Elizabethan literature, and consequently, is horrified when he is exposed as the writer of a romance novel. While at Buxton, Carol gets Michael in trouble with the faculty and convinces him to accompany her to New York. There she takes over his life, arranging for lessons in comportment and charm. Michael is a failure at speaking the romantic words he wrote, however, and after his screen test proves a dismal failure, he decides to return to Buxton.

Henry, meanwhile, has become intrigued by Carol and has decided that she would be terrific if she developed her human side more. Intending to see if she has anything other than a dollar sign for a heart, Henry contacts Michael and convinces the professor that he is in love with Carol. While radiating the charm and assurance that Carol has taught him, Michael begins to court her. Their courtship becomes headline news, and although she is not in love with him, Carol is afraid to tell him the truth for fear that he might walk out on his contract.

Henry is thoroughly enjoying Carol's predicament until he kisses her and begins to fall in love with her himself. When Carol tries to trick Michael into going to Hollywood while she takes refuge at her father's house in Washington, D.C., Michael outsmarts her, follows her home and announces their engagement. Thus trapped, Carol agrees to the marriage.

On the eve of the wedding, the guests are socializing in the various rooms of the Ainsley house when Carol, angry at Henry for agreeing to be the best man, goes to his room to confront him. After Henry insults Carol and accuses her of being only a "ten percent woman," she slaps him, runs into the hallway and announces that she is calling off the wedding because she is not in love with Michael and refuses to be married just for the sake of business. Henry listens to her speech in admiration, and when she finishes, she rushes into his arms.

Cast
 Rosalind Russell as Carol Ainsley
 Brian Aherne as Henry Pepper
 Willard Parker as Michael Cobb
 Alan Dinehart as Pat O'Shea
 Edward Fielding as Sen. Howard Ainsley
 Ann Savage as Jane Drake 
 Norma Varden as Miss Timmons
 Douglas Wood as Dean Alfred B. Shaeffer
 Grady Sutton as Mr. Clark

References

External links
 
 
 
 

1943 films
American romantic comedy films
1943 romantic comedy films
American black-and-white films
Columbia Pictures films
1940s English-language films
Films directed by Irving Cummings
1940s American films